Area codes 330 and 234 are telephone area codes in the North American Numbering Plan (NANP) for a part of northeast Ohio. The numbering plan area (NPA) includes the cities of Akron, Canton, Youngstown, and Warren.

Area code 330 was established on March 9, 1996 in an area code split of area code 216. It was Ohio's first new area code since the creation of NANP in 1947.

Area code 234, originally planned as the relief code for the Jacksonville, Florida area, was established on October 30, 2000, to form an overlay plan for the service area.  Ten-digit dialing has been mandatory since October 1, 2000.

See also

List of Ohio area codes
List of NANP area codes

References

External links

330
330
Telecommunications-related introductions in 1996
Telecommunications-related introductions in 2000